The Enclave may refer to:

 enclaves
The Enclave: a 2002 made-for-TV movie about the fall of Srebrenica and the Dutch government's failure to protect the town from attackers.
The Enclave, a now-defunct American record label.
 A group of enemies in the Fallout video game series. Introduced in Fallout 2
 an award-winning short story by Anne Charnock